is a former Japanese football player. She played for Japan national team.

Club career
Kishi was born on November 25, 1975. She played for Urawa Reinas FC.

National team career
On May 21, 1998, Kishi debuted for Japan national team against United States. She played at 1998 Asian Games. She played 9 games and scored 2 goals for Japan until 2001.

National team statistics

References

1975 births
Living people
Japanese women's footballers
Japan women's international footballers
Nadeshiko League players
Urawa Red Diamonds Ladies players
Asian Games bronze medalists for Japan
Asian Games medalists in football
Women's association football forwards
Footballers at the 1998 Asian Games
Medalists at the 1998 Asian Games